Kim Young-ran (born August 19, 1956) is a South Korean actress. Kim dropped out of Konkuk University in 1976 to pursue an acting career. She enjoyed her heyday as a leading actress in the late 1970s to the early 1980s, and continues to be active in supporting roles in television dramas until the present.

Filmography

Television series

Film

Variety show

Writings

Awards and nominations

References

External links 
 
 
 

1956 births
Living people
South Korean television actresses
South Korean film actresses
20th-century South Korean actresses
21st-century South Korean actresses
South Korean Buddhists
Best Actress Paeksang Arts Award (television) winners